Olga Yakovleva (sometimes spelled Iakovleva; June 15, 1986 – August 8, 2010) was a Russian women's basketball player. Olga was born in Vologda, Russia and represented her country in the FIBA under-19 and under-21 World Championships. In 2009, Olga was selected as Eurobasket.com All-Russian Superleague Honorable Mention. That same year, she won silver at the World University Games in Belgrade.

Olga played center for the Vologda-Chevakata Russian basketball team. Standing at well over 6 feet, she helped Vologda-Chevakata make it to the Russian Cup (basketball) semifinals in 2010.

Death 
On August 8, 2010, Olga Yakovleva drowned in the Vologda-Chevakata training camp pool, in Yuzhne near Odessa, Ukraine. The 24-year-old former Russian youth international player was relaxing in the pool with her colleagues and team coach Yury Zimin. He later told Lifenews.ru how he saw her start to swim underwater, and then saw her surface with “glassy eyes”. Medics said it was a “one in a million” accident: the autopsy showed no evidence of a seizure.

Awards and accomplishments 
Russian U19 National Team -2005
World Championships U19 -2005 (semifinals)
World Championships U21 in Tunisia -2005
Europe Cup Quarterfinals -2006, 2007
Russian U21 National Team -2005, 2007
World Championships U21 in Moscow Region (Russia) -2007
Russian University National Team -2007, 2009
World University Championships in Bangkok -2007
Eurobasket.com All-Russian Superleague Honorable Mention -2009
2009 Summer Universiade in Belgrade (Serbia) (Silver): 5 games: 11.4ppg, 3.2rpg, 1.4apg, 1.4spg, FGP: 52.9%, FT: 91.3%
Russian Cup Semifinals

References 

1986 births
2010 deaths
Russian women's basketball players
Deaths by drowning
Accidental deaths in Ukraine
People from Vologda
Universiade medalists in basketball
Universiade silver medalists for Russia
Medalists at the 2009 Summer Universiade
Sportspeople from Vologda Oblast